Ernest L. Riebau was a member of the Wisconsin State Assembly.

Biography
Riebau was born on August 7, 1895 in Milwaukee, Wisconsin. He became president and manager of a shoe manufacturing company. Riebau also was in the investment business. He died on October 3, 1947.

Political career
Riebau was elected to the Assembly in 1944 as a Republican. He remained a member until his death.

References

Politicians from Milwaukee
Businesspeople from Milwaukee
Republican Party members of the Wisconsin State Assembly
1895 births
1947 deaths
20th-century American politicians
20th-century American businesspeople